3rd Battalion  may refer to:

 3rd Battalion, 6th Field Artillery, a field artillery battalion of the United States Army
 3rd Battalion, 16th Field Artillery, a field artillery battalion of the United States Army
 3rd Battalion, 29th Field Artillery, a unit of the 3rd Brigade Combat Team
 3rd Battalion, 69th Armor Regiment, a United States Army combined arms battalion
 3rd Battalion, 126th Aviation Regiment, an aviation battalion of the United States Army Massachusetts National Guard
 3rd Battalion, 153rd Infantry Regiment, a United States infantry battalion
 3rd Battalion, 158th Aviation Regiment, an aviation battalion of the United States Army
 3rd Battalion, 187th Infantry Regiment, an infantry battalion of the United States Army
 3rd Battalion, 319th Field Artillery Regiment, a field artillery battalion of the United States Army
 3rd Battalion, CEF, a battalion of the Canadian Expeditionary Force
 3rd Battalion, Royal Anglian Regiment, the Territorial Army unit of the Royal Anglian Regiment
 3rd Battalion, Royal Australian Regiment, a parachute infantry battalion
 3rd Battalion, Parachute Regiment, a battalion-sized formation of the British Army's Parachute Regiment
 3rd Battalion, The Royal Canadian Regiment, a regular force infantry battalion
 3rd Battalion, Ulster Defence Regiment, a battalion of the British Army
 3rd Battalion (Australia), an infantry battalion of the Australian Army
 3rd Battalion 1st Marines, an infantry battalion in the United States Marine Corps
 3rd Battalion 2nd Marines, an infantry battalion in the United States Marine Corps
 3rd Battalion 3rd Marines, an infantry battalion in the United States Marine Corps
 3rd Battalion 4th Marines, an infantry battalion of the United States Marine Corps
 3rd Battalion 5th Marines, an infantry battalion in the United States Marine Corps
 3rd Battalion 6th Marines, an infantry battalion in the United States Marine Corps
 3rd Battalion 7th Marines, an infantry battalion of the United States Marine Corps
 3rd Battalion 8th Marines, an infantry battalion in the United States Marine Corps
 3rd Battalion 9th Marines, an infantry battalion of the United States Marine Corps
 3rd Battalion 10th Marines, an artillery battalion of the United States Marine Corps
 3rd Battalion 11th Marines, an artillery battalion of the United States Marine Corps
 3rd Battalion 12th Marines, an artillery battalion of the United States Marine Corps
 3rd Battalion 14th Marines, a reserve artillery battalion in the United States Marine Corps
 3rd Battalion 23rd Marines, a reserve infantry battalion in the United States Marine Corps
 3rd Battalion 24th Marines, a reserve infantry battalion in the United States Marine Corps
 3rd Battalion 25th Marines, a reserve infantry battalion in the United States Marine Corps
 3rd Battalion 28th Marines, an inactive infantry battalion of the United States Marine Corps